Melander is a surname. Notable people with the surname include:

People
Anders Melander of Nationalteatern, Swedish progg rock group from the 1970s that featured leftist political lyrics
Ann Melander (born 1961), Swedish former alpine skier who competed in the 1980 and 1984 Winter Olympics
Axel Leonard Melander (1878–1962), American entomologist specialising in Diptera and Hymenoptera
Dennis Melander (born 1983), Swedish footballer
Elisabeth Charlotte Melander (1640–1707), Countess of Holzappel from 1648 to 1707 and Schaumburg from 1656 to 1707
Eva Melander (born 1974), Swedish actress
Hilda Melander (born 1991), Swedish tennis player
Johan Melander (1910–1989), Norwegian banker
Jon Melander, retired American football offensive guard
Peter Melander Graf von Holzappel (1589–1648), Protestant military leader in the Thirty Years' War, Chief of the imperial troops of the League of 1647
Sven Melander (1947–2022), Swedish journalist, comedian, TV show host and actor

Fictional characters
Frederik Melander, character in a series of ten novels by Maj Sjöwall and Per Wahlöö, collectively titled The Story of a Crime

See also
Dryomyza melander, a fly from the family Dryomyzidae
Eudamias melander or black-veined mylon (Mylon maimon), a butterfly of the family Hesperiidae
Melan
Meland
Melanderia